Keyodhoo (Dhivehi: ކެޔޮދޫ) is the most populous of the islands of Vaavu Atoll.

Geography

Demography

Healthcare
A health center has been established at the island replacing a smaller health post in the past.

Transport
By 2003, a harbour had been built for the island.

References

Islands of the Maldives